Matangi is a Hindu goddess.

Matangi can also refer to:

Matangi (album), a 2013 album by M.I.A.
New Zealand FP class electric multiple unit, a class of rail units
Matangi Tonga, a newspaper
Matangi Tonga (American football) (born 1988), American football player
Matangi, Tokelau, an islet
Matangi, New Zealand, a settlement in the Hamilton Urban Area
Matagi Island, Fiji
M.I.A. (rapper), born Mathangi Arulpragasam.